Final results for the water polo tournament at the 1924 Summer Olympics. All medals were decided by using the Bergvall system.

Medal summary

Note: The players above the line played at least one game in this tournament, the players below the line were reserve players and did not compete in this tournament. Nevertheless the International Olympic Committee medal database exclusively credits them all as medalists. However the official report did not even count them as competitors.

Results

Silver medal tournament

Bronze medal tournament

Participating nations

Each country was allowed to enter a team of 11 players and they all were eligible for participation.
Austria withdrew without playing a match.
A total of 101 water polo players from 13 nations competed at the Paris Games:

Summary

References

Sources
 PDF documents in the LA84 Foundation Digital Library:
 Official Report of the 1924 Olympic Games (download, archive) (pp. 439–440, 486–494)
 Water polo on the Olympedia website
 Water polo at the 1924 Summer Olympics (men's tournament)
 Water polo on the Sports Reference website
 Water polo at the 1924 Summer Games (men's tournament) (archived)

 
1924 Summer Olympics events
1924
1924 in water polo
1924